This article lists planned future orbital and suborbital spaceflight launches and events.

For an overview of spaceflight in the near future, see 2020s in spaceflight.

Orbital launches

2023

2024

2025

2026

2027

2028 

|}

2029 

|}

2030 

 

|}

2031 

|}

2032 

|}

2033 and later 

|}

Deep-space rendezvous 

 China plans to return samples from Mars by 2031.
 JUICE is expected to enter an orbit around Ganymede in 2032.
 A joint NASA/ESA project plans to return samples from Mars by 2033.
 Dragonfly is expected to reach Titan in 2036.

References

External links

 
 
Spaceflight by year